This is a complete list of current bridges and other crossings of the Cumberland River from the Ohio River near Smithland upstream through northern Tennessee to the split into Martins Fork and Clover Fork near Baxter, in Harlan County, Kentucky.

Crossings

Kentucky (western)

Tennessee

Kentucky (eastern)

See also 

List of crossings of the Ohio River

References
Main references: Google Earth Imagery, July 2011 

River crossings
Cumberland
Cumberland
Cumberland
River crossings